Peter Lind & Company is a building contractor with bases in Central London and Spalding in Lincolnshire, England.

History

The original company was founded in 1915 by Danish engineer Herman Peter Thygesen Lind (1890–1956). In 1980 the company, following to a failed project in the Mole Valley and a docks lock-out in Merseyside, called  in receivers W.H. Cork Gully & Company, which sold off the assets. A group of former employees purchased certain rights and recommenced construction operations.

During the Second World War the company was a significant builder of Mulberry harbour units.

Major construction projects undertaken by the company include Waterloo Bridge in London (completed in 1945) and the BT Tower in London which was completed in 1964 by Peter Lind's son in law Thomas Jaeger.

Current operations
The company still has management members from the pre-1980 era and continues to carry out construction operations in London and throughout the U.K. The London division has a Private Clients arm aimed at the bespoke fit out market, which was reported in the Channel 5 TV series "Superior Interiors".

References

Sources

External links
 

Construction and civil engineering companies of England
Construction and civil engineering companies established in 1915
Companies based in Lincolnshire
1915 establishments in England
British companies established in 1915
Technology companies established in 1915